A child tax credit (CTC) is a tax credit for parents with dependent children given by various countries. The credit is often linked to the number of dependent children a taxpayer has and sometimes the taxpayer's income level. For example, in the United States, only families making less than $400,000 per year may claim the full CTC. Similarly, in the United Kingdom, the tax credit is only available for families making less than £42,000 per year.

Germany
The child allowance is an allowance in German tax law, in which a certain amount of money is tax-free in the taxation of parents. In the income tax fee paid, child benefit and tax savings through the child tax credit are compared against each other, and the parents pay whichever results in the lesser amount of tax.

United Kingdom

In the United Kingdom, a family with children and an income below about £32,200 could claim the child tax credit on top of child benefit. The tax credit is "non-wastable" – it is paid whether or not the family has a net tax liability – and is paid in or out of work. Higher rates are paid for disabled children. It is integrated with the working tax credit, which also provides support for childcare costs.

All taxable income is tested for the credit, so a couple who both work and have children, will have both salaries taken into account. Tax Credits may be capped which it is claimed could affect the poorest families disproportionately. On Monday 26 October 2015, the House of Lords voted for Labour Party proposals for financial redress to those affected by reduced entitlements.

Since 2018 Child Tax Credit has been replaced by Universal Credit for most people. UK citizens may claim Child Benefit which is paid out by the UK tax authority HMRC and anyone earning less than £50,000 year will receive the full benefit. Anyone earning between £50,000 and £60,000 per year will need a percentage back with £60,000 or more per year paying the full amount back. 

Currently, the only way to make a new claim for Child Tax Credit is if you have an existing Working Tax Credit claim. This will be phased out due to the government moving everyone over to Universal Credit and is expected to happen in 2024.

United States

The child tax credit is available to taxpayers who have children under the age of 17 (or in 2021 under the age of 18). Since 2018, the CTC is $2,000 per qualifying child. It is available in full to single filers who make up to $200,000 and married couples filing jointly who make up to $400,000. Above these limits, the CTC is phased out at the rate of $50 for each additional $1,000 earned. When a taxpayer's credit value exceeds his or her tax liability, the taxpayer is eligible for the additional child tax credit (ACTC), which is calculated as 15% of the taxpayer's AGI in excess of $2,500 (i.e. a family must make at least $2,500 to be eligible for the credit), with the refund value capped at $1,400.

The American Rescue Plan Act (ARP) of 2021 significantly expanded the child tax credit for one year, allowing qualifying families to offset $3,000 per child up to age 17 and $3,600 per child under age 6. It also made the credit fully-refundable and offered the option of receiving half of the credit as six monthly payments. 39 million households, covering 88% of children in the United States, will begin receiving these payments automatically beginning July 15, 2021. The proposed Build Back Better Act would extend the expansion for an additional year and make the full refundability of the CTC permanent.

The child tax credit has a significant effect on child poverty. In 2016, it was estimated to have lifted about 3 million children out of poverty. In 2021, a Columbia University study estimated that the expansion of the CTC in the American Rescue Plan Act reduced child poverty by an additional 26%, and would have decreased child poverty by 40% had all eligible households claimed the credit.

See also
Taxation in the United Kingdom
UK labour law
Taxation in the United States

Notes

References
Samuel A. Donaldson, Federal Income Taxation of Individuals: Cases, Problems and Materials, 2nd Edition (St. Paul: Thomson/West, 2007)
IRS Publication 972 (2007), Child Tax Credit

Tax credits
Taxation in the United States
Taxation in the United Kingdom
Tax terms